The Kenora Muskies, known as the Kenora Thistles from 1975 to 1982, are a defunct Manitoba Junior Hockey League team that played in Kenora, Ontario between 1968 and 1982.

History
The Kenora Muskies were granted expansion into the Memorial Cup-eligible Manitoba Junior Hockey League in 1968.  Two season later, the league was relegated to Tier II Junior A and competed for the Manitoba Centennial Cup.

The Muskies best year in the league came in 1970-71 when they finished first place in the regular season but failed to win the Turnbull Cup as playoff champions.

In 1975, the Muskies were renamed to the traditional Kenora namesake, the Thistles.  The original Kenora Thistles were 1906 Stanley Cup champions.

In 1982, the Thistles folded after three progressively worse losing seasons.

Season-by-season record
Note: GP = Games Played, W = Wins, L = Losses, T = Ties, OTL = Overtime Losses, GF = Goals for, GA = Goals against

Playoffs
1969 Lost Semi-final
Kenora Muskies defeated Selkirk Steelers 4-games-to-1
Dauphin Kings defeated Kenora Muskies 4-games-to-2
1970 Lost Semi-final
Kenora Muskies defeated Portage Terriers 4-games-to-2
Dauphin Kings defeated Kenora Muskies 4-games-to-1
1971 Lost Final
Kenora Muskies defeated Dauphin Kings 4-games-to-3
Kenora Muskies defeated Selkirk Steelers 4-games-to-1
St. Boniface Saints defeated Kenora Muskies 4-games-to-none
1972 Lost Quarter-final
Portage Terriers defeated Kenora Muskies 4-games-to-1
1973 Lost Semi-final
Kenora Muskies defeated Selkirk Steelers 4-games-to-2
Portage Terriers defeated Kenora Muskies 4-games-to-none
1974 DNQ
1975 DNQ
1976 DNQ
1977 Lost Semi-final
Kenora Thistles defeated St. Boniface Saints 4-games-to-2
Kildonan North Stars defeated Kenora Thistles 4-games-to-3
1978 Lost Semi-final
Kenora Thistles defeated St. James Canadians 4-games-to-1
Kildonan North Stars defeated Kenora Thistles 4-games-to-2
1979 Lost Quarter-final
Kildonan North Stars defeated Kenora Thistles 4-games-to-3
1980 Lost Quarter-final
Selkirk Steelers defeated Kenora Thistles 4-games-to-none
1981 Lost Quarter-final
St. Boniface Saints defeated Kenora Thistles 4-games-to-none
1982 Lost Quarter-final
Fort Garry Blues defeated Kenora Thistles 4-games-to-none

Notable alumni
Muskies
Mitch Babin
Charlie Luksa
Charlie Simmer
Rick St. Croix
Thistles
Mike Allison
Ted Nolan

See also
List of ice hockey teams in Ontario

External links
Kenora Thistles

Defunct Manitoba Junior Hockey League teams
Sport in Kenora
1968 establishments in Ontario
1982 disestablishments in Ontario
Ice hockey clubs established in 1968
Ice hockey clubs disestablished in 1982
Ice hockey teams in Ontario
Hockey Northwestern Ontario